William McLennan is the name of:

 Scotty McLennan (born 1948 as William L. McLennan Jr.), American minister, lawyer and academic
 Bill McLennan (1942–2022), Australian statistician
 William McLennan (politician) (1903–1980), Canadian Member of Parliament
 Bill McLennan (rugby league) (1927–2007), New Zealand rugby league international
 William McLennan (cricketer), New Zealand cricketer